The following lists events in 1912 in Iceland.

Incumbents
Prime Minister – Kristján Jónsson (until 24 July); Hannes Hafstein (from 24 July)

Events
The 1912 Úrvalsdeild season was the first season of league football in Iceland.
Kveldúlfur was established.
Íshúsfélag Ísfirðinga was established.
The Farmers' Party was established.
Bandalag íslenskra skáta was founded.

Births
8 January – Sigurður Þórarinsson, geologist, volcanologist, and glaciologist (d. 1983).

Deaths

31 August – Indriði Indriðason, spiritualist medium (b. 1883)
24 November – Björn Jónsson, politician (b. 1846)

References

 
Iceland
Iceland
Years of the 20th century in Iceland